The 1975 Tulane Green Wave football team was an American football team that represented Tulane University during the 1975 NCAA Division I football season as an independent. In their fifth year under head coach Bennie Ellender, the team compiled a 4–7 record.

Schedule

References

Tulane
Tulane Green Wave football seasons
Tulane Green Wave football